Manoj Kumar is a Fijian chess player who has won the Fiji National Championship eight times: 1998, 1999, 2000, 2003, 2007, 2008, 2009, and 2010.
The Fiji Sports Councils Awards named him Fiji national domestic Player of the year twice, in 2007 and 2008.

Kumar won the first Fiji Invitational Championship in 2003.

Kumar represented Fiji in the most Oceania championships: 2001; 2007 Nadi, Fiji; 2009 Gold Coast; and 2011 Rotoura, New Zealand. Kumar also represented Fiji in three Chess Olympiads.

References

External links

1977 births
Fijian chess players
Chess Olympiad competitors
Living people
Fijian people of Indian descent